Hardy Jair Meza Rendón (born 21 August 2000) is a Mexican professional footballer who currently plays as a midfielder.

References

External links
 
 
 Hardy Meza at Official Liga MX Profile
 

2000 births
Living people
Mexican footballers
C.F. Pachuca players
Association football midfielders
Footballers from Sinaloa
Cancún F.C. footballers
Alebrijes de Oaxaca players
Mineros de Zacatecas players
Liga de Expansión MX players
Liga Premier de México players